The 1997 Major League Soccer season was the second season of Major League Soccer. It was also the 85th season of FIFA-sanctioned soccer in the United States, and the 19th with a national first-division league.

Stadiums and locations

Personnel and sponsorships

Standings

Eastern Conference

Western Conference

Overall standings

MLS Cup Playoffs

Bracket
The ties were a best-of-three series.

Conference Semi-finals

Eastern Conference

D.C. United advance to the Conference Finals.

Columbus Crew advance to the Conference Finals.

Western Conference

Dallas Burn advance to the Conference Finals.

Colorado Rapids advance to the Conference Finals.

Conference finals

Western Conference

Colorado Rapids advance to MLS Cup '97.

Eastern Conference

D.C. United advance to MLS Cup '97.

MLS Cup

D.C. United and Colorado Rapids earn a berth to the 1998 CONCACAF Champions' Cup.

Player awards

Weekly awards

Monthly awards

End-of-season awards

Player statistics

Top goal scorers

Goalkeeping leaders
(Minimum 1,000 minutes)

Played for more than one team – Most Recent Team Listed*

Attendance

Coaches

Eastern Conference
D.C. United: Bruce Arena
New York/New Jersey MetroStars: Carlos Alberto Parreira

Western Conference
Dallas Burn: Dave Dir
Kansas City Wiz: Ron Newman
San Jose Clash: Brian Quinn

References
MLS Site

 
Major League Soccer seasons
1